The Tutts are a five-piece New Zealand rock band. They released their first single, titled "K", on 21 November 2006. The song is featured on C4, a New Zealand music television station, as the C4 "theme song".
..2006 also saw The Tutts support both The Lemonheads & The Strokes on their New Zealand tours.
The Tutts were nominated for single of the year with "K" at the 2007 New Zealand Music Awards. They also performed at the Auckland Big Day Out 2007 & 2009.

The Tutts are known for the varying quality of their live shows. This can be partly attributed to the on stage antics of lead singer Scott Allen.

Their first,(and last) album, Get in the Club, was released on 20 October 2008.

Band members
Scott Allen – Singer/synth
Mat Robertson – Guitar
Dan McLaughlin – Guitar/synth
John McNab – Bass
James Percy – drums

Discography
 Get in the Club (2008)

Track 1.  Western Zeal - 4:42
Track 2.  Grow Up - 4:29
Track 3.  All Over Town - 4:00
Track 4.  Get Contented - 3:40
Track 5.  K - 3:28
Track 6.  Devo - 3:48
Track 7.  Whiteout - 4:09
Track 8.  In My Lifetime - 3:30
Track 9.  Seven - 7:17
Track 10.  Cut The Rope - 3:21
Track 11.  i20 - 4:39
Track 12.  Odyssey - 5:09
Track 13.  Same Old Thing - 3:54

External links
Official website
Music video for "K"

New Zealand rock music groups